The Hambantota Solar Power Station (also known as the Buruthakanda Solar Park) is the first commercial-scale solar power station in Sri Lanka. The photovoltaic solar facility was constructed in Buruthakanda, in the Hambantota District. The plant is owned and operated by the Sri Lanka Sustainable Energy Authority, a state-run organization responsible for renewable resources.

Subcontractor of the second phase is Sunpower Systems (Pvt)Ltd.

The generated power would be sold to the state-run power company Ceylon Electricity Board, while the revenue would be used to promote rural electrification projects.

See also 

 Energy in Sri Lanka
 List of power stations in Sri Lanka

References 

Solar power stations in Sri Lanka
Buildings and structures in Hambantota District